The Robert Stow Bradley Jr. Memorial is a fountain and memorial on the Harvard University campus, in Cambridge, Massachusetts.

Description and history
The brick-and-stone drinking fountain was designed by A. W. Longfellow and erected in 1910 in memory of R. S. Bradley, Jr., who graduated from Harvard College in 1907 and died later that year. The inscription reads:

References

External links
 

1910 establishments in Massachusetts
Drinking fountains in the United States
Fountains in Massachusetts
Harvard University
Monuments and memorials in Massachusetts
Outdoor sculptures in Cambridge, Massachusetts